Ziethe is a river of Saxony-Anhalt, Germany. It flows into the Fuhne near Preußlitz.

Cities and towns
Scheuder
Libbesdorf
Merzien
Zehringen
Köthen (Anhalt)
Großpaschleben
Zabitz
Trinum
Kleinpaschleben
Crüchern
Wohlsdorf
Biendorf
Plömnitz

See also
List of rivers of Saxony-Anhalt

Rivers of Saxony-Anhalt
Rivers of Germany